Agraylea sexmaculata is a species of insect belonging to the family Hydroptilidae.

It is native to Europe.

References

Hydroptilidae